Antony Rafiq Khan (born October 10, 1982) is an American businessman, promoter, and sports executive. He is known for his involvement in American football, professional wrestling and soccer. He is best known as the founder and co-owner of All Elite Wrestling (AEW), in which he also holds the positions of president, chief executive, general manager and executive producer of the promotion.

He is the son of businessman Shahid Khan, who is the owner of the Jacksonville Jaguars of the National Football League (NFL) and  club Fulham. He holds executive roles at both organizations: with the Jaguars, he is chief football strategy officer and with Fulham, he is the vice-chairman and director of football operations. Other business ventures that Khan is involved in include TruMedia Networks, Activist Artists Management and Ring of Honor (ROH).

Early life 
Tony Khan was born on October 10, 1982, in Urbana–Champaign, Illinois, U.S., to Pakistani-American father, Shahid Khan, and an American mother, Ann Carlson. His father became a billionaire in the automotive industry, through his ownership of Flex-N-Gate, which supplied car bumpers. He also has a sister named Shanna. Tony graduated from the University Laboratory High School in 2001 and University of Illinois Urbana-Champaign in 2007 with a Bachelor of Science degree in finance.

Business ventures

American football and soccer

Jacksonville Jaguars 
Khan joined the Jacksonville Jaguars in July 2012, following his father's purchase of the team, and currently serves as Senior  President of Football and Analytics.

In April 2020, then-Jaguars defensive end Yannick Ngakoue referred to Khan as "spoiled", after a confrontation on Twitter. Ngakoue was eventually traded to the Minnesota Vikings.

Fulham 
On February 22, 2017, Khan was named as vice-chairman and director of football operations of Fulham. He oversees the identification, evaluation, recruitment, general maintenance and signing of players for Fulham. Khan assumed these responsibilities following a period of advising the football operations at the club, particularly in the areas of analytics and research. Although Khan was not able to have an immediate effect (as it was after the January transfer window), Fulham only lost twice and went on a run that saw them finish the season in sixth place, where they were defeated in the play-off semi-final to Reading.

Khan's first full season as vice-chairman, saw the breakout of youth product Ryan Sessegnon as well as the mid-season loan signing of Aleksandar Mitrović amongst the goals, as Fulham earned promotion to the Premier League by defeating Aston Villa in the play-off final, of which he was present. In the 2018–19 season, Fulham brought in a number of expensive signings, headlined by the permanent signing of Mitrović from Newcastle United and Jean Michaël Seri from Nice. By January 2019, Fulham were stuck in the relegation zone, despite having sacked Slaviša Jokanović and replacing him with Claudio Ranieri. Around this time, Khan was criticised for telling a supporter of the club to "go to hell", although he claimed that this person had previously hounded him before. After Ranieri's departure, BBC Radio 5 Live pundits Ian Wright and Chris Sutton questioned Khan's capability in the job, with Wright even suggesting that Shahid Khan should sack his son. Fulham ended the season in 19th place, resulting in the second relegation under Shahid Khan's ownership.

In the 2019–20 season, caretaker manager Scott Parker was named manager on a permanent basis, with the summer transfers consisting mostly of loan signings. Fulham would end the season – which was interrupted by the COVID-19 pandemic – in 4th place, once again earning promotion to the Premier League by defeating Brentford in the play-off final. Unable to appear at the final, Khan made a FaceTime call to congratulate Fulham's players. In the 2020–21 season, Fulham brought in a mix of loan and permanent signings, including Terence Kongolo and Harrison Reed who played for the club on loan the previous season. In September 2020, Khan was called a "clown" by Sky Sports pundit Jamie Carragher for tweeting critical comments of Fulham players, and described the transfer history of Khan as "a right mess". Khan's comments angered Parker, who described the situation as "the world we live in". Fulham ended the season in 18th place, resulting in another relegation. In the 2021–22 season, Marco Silva succeeded Parker as manager, leading to Fulham topping the Championship. Mitrović scored 43 goals, easily breaking the record set by Ivan Toney (in 2020–21), as well as the record set by Guy Whittingham for the most scored in a 46-game season. In an interview with The Athletic, Khan stated that he had convinced Mitrović to stay, despite interest from Dynamo Moscow and following a season in which he only scored three goals. He was also optimistic that this would be the season that Fulham would no longer be perceived as a "yo-yo club".

Professional wrestling

All Elite Wrestling 
In late 2018, Khan, who is a lifelong fan of professional wrestling, filed for several trademarks for a new venture that was shortly thereafter confirmed to be a new professional wrestling promotion, All Elite Wrestling (AEW). Khan and his father, Shahid Khan, are the promotion's lead investors. The company was officially announced on January 1, 2019, along with its first event, Double or Nothing, which took place on May 25, 2019, at the MGM Grand Garden Arena in Las Vegas, Nevada. Khan serves as president and CEO of AEW.

On April 25, 2019, Khan revealed the five-year plan for AEW where he stated: "The 5-year plan for AEW is firstly, to have built up a brand, secondly to have built up a roster and thirdly, to have established AEW as a top brand in wrestling for an audience who desire fast-paced exciting action and want a product that is more of a sporting based product."

On May 1, 2020, Khan talked about the creative process in AEW and how he grants creative freedom to the AEW talent wrestlers on the roster. At the same time, he does not want to write dialogue that is not believable for a specific wrestler, saying he would never hand a wrestler a piece of paper and tell them to memorize six paragraphs to recite. Khan singled out Darby Allin as a prime example of a talented performer that needs to speak in his own words, saying: "I can't speak for Darby Allin, nobody can but Darby." Khan has also stated: "I'm deep in the weeds. I write shows, lay out a large percentage of the stories, approve any and every segment that goes on the air, and I don't just sit around and wait for people to pitch ideas to me." The Executive Vice Presidents of AEW, The Young Bucks, have clarified that Khan has the final say on AEW creative and booking, and that even though the other Executive Vice Presidents of AEW, Kenny Omega, Young Bucks themselves, and Cody Rhodes have had a lot of creative freedom for their own matches and segments, and have a "back and forth creative flow" with Khan, Khan has the final say on everything.

In June 2021, Khan made another statement on the AEW business perspective, saying: "I don't want to be the next 'blank' wrestling company of the past—fill in the blank ... . We love wrestling of the past, wrestling of the present and wrestling of the future... That's what gives us a great chance to retain and gain audience share, ... I'm glad that WCW failed because it created a vacancy for us to come in and succeed ... but it made it a fairly bleak period for the wrestling business."

On September 3, 2021, during an AEW media call, Khan further clarified that "not one person on the roster has creative control". Khan further stated: "It's not like WCW and that is one of the issues with WCW ... When you have a person who has creative control in their contract, it can hold up the show. I don't know how you get through TV doing that." Khan then added: "Just because nobody has a contractual right to tell me 'you can't make me do that, you can't put me in that match,' doesn't mean I want to put people in bad situations or do things that don't make sense to them or for their career or for the fans."

Reception 

Khan's work with All Elite Wrestling has granted him the Wrestling Observer Newsletter Promoter of the Year award from 2019 to 2021 and the Best Booker from 2020 to 2021. Khan has been praised by multiple people in the wrestling industry, including Chris Jericho, Jim Ross, Jon Moxley, Britt Baker, Matt Hardy, Adam Cole, Malakai Black, and former wrestling promoter Eric Bischoff.

In December 2021, Khan came under fire for comments responding to released wrestler Big Swole's allegations of deficits in structure, as well as lack of diversity; in response, Khan stated that he "let Swole's contract expire as [he] felt her wrestling wasn't good enough."

Ring of Honor 
On the March 2, 2022 episode of AEW Dynamite, Khan announced that he had acquired professional wrestling promotion Ring of Honor (ROH) from Sinclair Broadcast Group. The acquisition includes ROH assets such as the promotion's video library, brand assets, intellectual property, production equipment and more. Khan also announced that he intends to make the ROH library available to the public in its entirety. It was later clarified through a press release issued by Khan's Twitter account that the acquisition would be made through an entity wholly-owned by Khan, resulting in the purchase being made separately from AEW. On March 6, 2022, Khan revealed that he planned to keep ROH running as a separate entity from AEW, and also indicated that ROH could possibly be used as a developmental brand for AEW.

WWE 
After Vince McMahon returned to the WWE as chairman, CNBC reported on January 12, 2023 that he and his father are interested on purchasing the promotion after reports the company was up for sale.

Other business ventures 
Khan is the owner and chairman of TruMedia Networks, a Boston-based engineering firm specializing in analytics for the athletic sports industry. Khan acquired TruMedia Networks in 2015, and under his ownership, the company has expanded its sports analytics engineering services, with clients including ESPN, the National Football League, Zebra Technologies, and over 60 percent of all Major League Baseball clubs.

Along with TruMedia Networks, Khan and his family helped fund Activist Artists Management, a talent management and advisory firm founded in 2018. Khan made a significant investment in the firm, and separately established the Activist content and venture fund focused on investments in media, entertainment, hospitality as well as consumer products, services, and technologies.

Filmography 

Rhodes To The Top as himself (2021)

Awards 
 Wrestling Observer Newsletter
 Promoter of the Year (2019–2022)
 Best Booker (2020–2022)

References

External links
 

1982 births
Living people
All Elite Wrestling executives
All Elite Wrestling personnel
American people of Pakistani descent
American sports businesspeople
Professional wrestling promoters
Professional wrestling writers
University Laboratory High School (Urbana, Illinois) alumni
Gies College of Business alumni
Shahid Khan